Electrónico is a 2002 compilation album by the folk-influenced Portuguese band Madredeus. The tracks come from the following albums: O Espirito Da Paz, Ainda, O Paradiso, Antologia and Movimento.

Track listing

Portuguese original
"Haja O Que Houver" (Pedro Ayres Magalhães) - 5:07
"Vem (Alem De Toda A Solidao)" (Magalhães) - 3:11
"Ecos Na Catedral" (Carlos Maria Trindade) - 4:12
"O Paraiso" (Magalhães) - 5:30
"O Mar" (Magalhães) - 7:34
"O Sonho" (Magalhães) - 5:32
"A Lira-Solidao No Oceano" (Magalhães) - 5:33
"A Andorinha Da Primavera" (Magalhães/Trindade) - 5:37
"Oxala" (Magalhães) - 5:18
"Ao Longe O Mar" (Magalhães) - 8:14
"Ainda Insect" (Magalhães) - 6:50
"Anseio (Fuga Apressada)" (Magalhães) - 4:40
"Guitarra" (Magalhães/Rodrigo Leão) - 8:04

English translation
"Come what may"
"Come (Beyond All The Loneliness)" 
"Echoes In The Cathedral"
"The Paradise"
"The Sea"
"The Dream"
"The Lyre - Loneliness In The Ocean"
"The Swallow of Spring"
"I Hope (May God Wish)"
"Faraway The Sea"
"Still"
"Anxiety (Rushing Fugue)"
"Guitar"

All songs translated to English by their respective authors.

Personnel
 Teresa Salgueiro - vocals
 José Peixoto - classic guitar
 Pedro Ayres Magalhães - classic guitar
 Francisco Ribeiro - cello
 Gabriel Gomes - accordion
 Rodrigo Leão - keyboards
 Fernando Judic - acoustic bass guitar
 Carlos Maria Trindade - keyboards

References
 
 Spotify link

2002 albums
Madredeus albums